The Importance of Being Earnest is a 2002 romantic comedy-drama film directed by Oliver Parker, based on Oscar Wilde's classic 1895 comedy of manners of the same name. The original music score is composed by Charlie Mole. The film grossed $8.4 million in North America.

Plot
In this adaptation of Oscar Wilde's play about fake identities, two gentlemen in 1890s London use the same pseudonym, Ernest, for their secret courtship activities.  Chaos ensues when both men find themselves face-to-face and have to explain who they really are.

Cast
 Rupert Everett as Algernon "Algy" Moncrieff
 Colin Firth as John "Jack" Worthing/Ernest
 Frances O'Connor as Gwendolen Fairfax
 Reese Witherspoon as Cecily Cardew
 Judi Dench as Lady Bracknell
 Tom Wilkinson as Dr Chasuble
 Anna Massey as Miss Prism
 Edward Fox as Lane
 Patrick Godfrey as Merriman

Production notes

 Dame Judi Dench portrayed Lady Bracknell for the third time, having been cast in the 1982 National Theatre revival and the 1995 BBC Radio 4 adaptation.
 Actress Finty Williams, who plays Lady Bracknell as a young dancer, is the daughter of Dame Judi Dench, who plays the older Lady Bracknell.
 The scene where Algernon slaps Jack on his rear end and where Algernon kisses Jack's cheek were ad libbed. Director Parker thought Firth's stunned reaction was so humorous he decided to leave it in.
 The business with 'Ernest's' bill at the Savoy, and with the money collectors coming to Jack's country home, are taken from material Wilde cut from the play prior to its publication.
 Though cut from the revised version, the gardener Molton can be seen in the background of many scenes.
 The producers of the film paid £50,000 to use West Wycombe Park as Jack's home in the country.

Release
The Importance of Being Earnest grossed $8,384,929 domestically and $8,906,041 internationally for a worldwide total of $17,290,970, making the film a moderate box office success based on its $15 million budget.

Reception
Roger Ebert of the Chicago Sun-Times awarded the film three out of four stars, saying the actors were well cast, and performed well.

On review aggregate website Rotten Tomatoes, as of September 2012, the film holds a 57% approval rating, with the consensus "Oliver Parker's adaptation of  Wilde's classic play is breezy entertainment, helped by an impressive cast, but it also suffers from some peculiar directorial choices that ultimately dampen the film's impact."

Awards and nominations

The film won the 2003 Italian National Syndicate of Film Journalists's Silver Ribbon award for Best Costume Design; the costumes were designed by Maurizio Millenotti.

Reese Witherspoon was nominated for a Teen Choice Award (Choice Actress – Comedy) for her performance as Cecily.

References

External links
 
 
 
 
 
 Where Did They Film that? The Importance of Being Earnest

2002 romantic comedy films
2002 films
American romantic comedy films
British romantic comedy films
2000s English-language films
Films based on The Importance of Being Earnest
Films directed by Oliver Parker
Films set in England
Films set in the 1890s
Films shot in England
2000s German-language films
Films set in the Victorian era
Films set in country houses
Newmarket films
2000s American films
2000s British films